Air Bishkek was an airline based in Bishkek, Kyrgyzstan, with its operational base at Manas International Airport. It was founded as Eastok Avia (E4/EAA) in 2006 and renamed to Kyrgyz Airways. In 2011 the airline was again rebranded into Air Bishkek. Due to alleged poor safety standards in Kyrgyzstan, the airline has been included in the List of air carriers banned in the European Union since 12 October 2006.  The airline stopped operating in February 2016 after experiencing financial difficulties. As of June 2016, its Air Operator Certificate has been suspended.

Destinations
Air Bishkek operated flights to the following destinations:
China
Ürümqi – Ürümqi Diwopu International Airport
Kyrgyzstan
Bishkek – Manas International Airport (base)
Osh – Osh Airport  (base)
Russia
Irkutsk – International Airport Irkutsk
Moscow – Moscow Domodedovo Airport
Surgut – Surgut International Airport
Belgorod - Belgorod International Airport
Novosibirsk – Tolmachevo Airport
Yekaterinburg - Koltsovo Airport

Fleet
The Air Bishkek fleet consists of the following aircraft (as of August 2016):

Maintenance  
 Kyrgyz Airways contracted Turkish Technic under a maintenance services agreement for its Boeing B737-300 for May 2010.

Frequent flyer program
In 2010 Air Bishkek became the first airline in Kyrgyzstan to introduce a frequent flyer program, which it named Belek Bonus, after the Kyrgyz word for 'gift'.

References

External links

Official website 

Defunct airlines of Kyrgyzstan
Airlines formerly banned in the European Union
Airlines established in 2004
2004 establishments in Kyrgyzstan
Airlines disestablished in 2016
2016 disestablishments in Asia